Sifiso is a South African given name. When translated to English It means Wish. Notable people with the name include:

Sifiso Myeni (born 1988), South African football player 
Sifiso Mzobe, South African author
Sifiso Nhlapo (born 1987), South African racing cyclist 
Sifiso M. Radebe, South African Gnostic
V. Sifiso Skosana (born 1984), Electrical Artisan 

African given names